Prashant Bose, commonly known by his nom de guerre Kishan or Kishan da is a senior Politburo member of the Communist Party of India (Maoist). He has previously used Nirbhay Mukherjee, Kajal, Kishan-da and Mahesh as aliases. Kishan, the former MCCI chief is now No. 2 in the CPI (Maoist). He is in charge of Bihar and Jharkhand and heading the Party's Eastern Regional Bureau. And this Bengali Maoist leader, 74 in age is also a known intellectual of the party. 
 
In September 2004, Maoist Communist Centre of India and Communist Party of India (Marxist–Leninist) People's War had joined to form CPI (Maoist). The agreement had been signed between Kishan, General Secretary, Central Committee of Maoist Communist Centre of India and Ganapathy, General Secretary Central Committee, CPI (M-L People's War). 
 
Bose hails from Jadavpur, Kolkata. His wife Sheela Marandi, another central committee member of CPI (Maoist) was imprisoned from 2006 to 2016. Bose and his wife has been arrested by Jharkhand police on 12 November 2021.

References

Anti-revisionists
Communist Party of India (Maoist) politicians
Living people
Naxalite–Maoist insurgency
Maoist theorists
Year of birth missing (living people)